Shirer is a surname. Notable people with the surname include:

 Margaret Peoples Shirer (1897-1983), American missionary
 Priscilla Shirer (born 1974), American author
 William L. Shirer (1904-1993), American journalist and war correspondent